The German School Jakarta, often informally referred to as DSJ, is a German international school in the BSD community of South Tangerang in Greater Jakarta, Indonesia. It offers comprehensive education from early childhood (preschool) to secondary school.

The school was formerly known as the German International School Jakarta (informally DIS Jakarta). In 1998 it moved into its newly built campus in BSD.

References

External links
Official Website

Former Websites (Web Archive):
 dsjakarta.de (2015-2022)
 dis-jakarta.org (2014-2015)
 dis.or.id (2000-2014)

Jakarta
International schools in Greater Jakarta
Schools in Banten
Educational institutions established in 1957
1957 establishments in Indonesia